Lepidoblepharis rufigularis is a species of gecko, a lizard in the family Sphaerodactylidae. The species is endemic to Panama.

Geographic range
L. rufigularis is found in Darién Province, Panama.

Description
The male of L. rufigularis has a reddish throat, to which the specific name refers (rufus = red + gula = throat).

References

Further reading
Batista, Abel; Ponce, Marcos; Vesely, Milan; Mebert, Konrad; Hertz, Andreas; Köhler, Gunther; Carrizo, Arcadio; Lotzkat, Sebastian (2015). "Revision of the genus Lepidoblepharis (Reptilia: Squamata: Sphaerodactylidae) in Central America, with the description of three new species". Zootaxa 3994 (2): 187–221. (Lepidoblepharis rufigularis, new species, pp. 197–201, Figures 3-5 + Figure 11 on p. 210).

Lepidoblepharis
Reptiles described in 2015
Taxa named by Gunther Köhler